There are many ways to derive the Lorentz transformations utilizing a variety of physical principles, ranging from Maxwell's equations to Einstein's postulates of special relativity, and mathematical tools, spanning from elementary algebra and hyperbolic functions, to linear algebra and group theory.

This article provides a few of the easier ones to follow in the context of special relativity, for the simplest case of a Lorentz boost in standard configuration, i.e. two inertial frames moving relative to each other at constant (uniform) relative velocity less than the speed of light, and using Cartesian coordinates so that the x and x′ axes are collinear.

Lorentz transformation

In the fundamental branches of modern physics, namely general relativity and its widely applicable subset special relativity, as well as relativistic quantum mechanics and relativistic quantum field theory, the Lorentz transformation is the transformation rule under which all four-vectors and tensors containing physical quantities transform from one frame of reference to another.

The prime examples of such four-vectors are the four-position and four-momentum of a particle, and for fields the electromagnetic tensor and stress–energy tensor. The fact that these objects transform according to the Lorentz transformation is what mathematically defines them as vectors and tensors; see tensor for a definition.

Given the components of the four-vectors or tensors in some frame, the "transformation rule" allows one to determine the altered components of the same four-vectors or tensors in another frame, which could be boosted or accelerated, relative to the original frame. A "boost" should not be conflated with spatial translation, rather it's characterized by the relative velocity between frames. The transformation rule itself depends on the relative motion of the frames. In the simplest case of two inertial frames the relative velocity between enters the transformation rule. For rotating reference frames or general non-inertial reference frames, more parameters are needed, including the relative velocity (magnitude and direction), the rotation axis and angle turned through.

Historical background

The usual treatment (e.g., Albert Einstein's original work) is based on the invariance of the speed of light. However, this is not necessarily the starting point: indeed (as is described, for example, in the second volume of the Course of Theoretical Physics by Landau and Lifshitz), what is really at stake is the locality of interactions: one supposes that the influence that one particle, say, exerts on another can not be transmitted instantaneously. Hence, there exists a theoretical maximal speed of information transmission which must be invariant, and it turns out that this speed coincides with the speed of light in vacuum. Newton had himself called the idea of action at a distance philosophically "absurd", and held that gravity had to be transmitted by some agent according to certain laws.

Michelson and Morley in 1887 designed an experiment, employing an interferometer and a half-silvered mirror, that was accurate enough to detect aether flow. The mirror system reflected the light back into the interferometer. If there were an aether drift, it would produce a phase shift and a change in the interference that would be detected. However, no phase shift was ever found. The negative outcome of the Michelson–Morley experiment left the concept of aether (or its drift) undermined. There was consequent perplexity as to why light evidently behaves like a wave, without any detectable medium through which wave activity might propagate.

In a 1964 paper, Erik Christopher Zeeman showed that the causality-preserving property, a condition that is weaker in a mathematical sense than the invariance of the speed of light, is enough to assure that the coordinate transformations are the Lorentz transformations. Norman Goldstein's paper shows a similar result using inertiality (the preservation of time-like lines) rather than causality.

Physical principles 
Einstein based his theory of special relativity on two fundamental postulates.  First, all physical laws are the same for all inertial frames of reference, regardless of their relative state of motion; and second, the speed of light in free space is the same in all inertial frames of reference, again, regardless of the relative velocity of each reference frame.  The Lorentz transformation is fundamentally a direct consequence of this second postulate.

The second postulate 
Assume the second postulate of special relativity stating the constancy of the speed of light, independent of reference frame, and consider a collection of reference systems moving with respect to each other with constant velocity, i.e. inertial systems, each endowed with its own set of Cartesian coordinates labeling the points, i.e. events of spacetime. To express the invariance of the speed of light in mathematical form, fix two events in spacetime, to be recorded in each reference frame. Let the first event be the emission of a light signal, and the second event be it being absorbed.

Pick any reference frame in the collection. In its coordinates, the first event will be assigned coordinates , and the second . One may therefore set up the equation

Every other coordinate system will record, in its own coordinates, the same equation. This is the immediate mathematical consequence of the invariance of the speed of light. The quantity on the left is called the spacetime interval. The interval is, for events separated by light signals, the same (zero) in all reference frames, and is therefore called invariant.

Invariance of interval
For the Lorentz transformation to have the physical significance realized by nature, it is crucial that the interval is an invariant measure for any two events, not just for those separated by light signals. To establish this, one considers an infinitesimal interval,

as recorded in a system . Let  be another system assigning the interval  to the same two infinitesimally separated events.

On what may  depend? It may not depend on the positions of the two events in spacetime, because that would violate the postulated homogeneity of spacetime.

From these it follows,

However, one also observes that the left-hand side does not depend on this angle. Thus, the only way for the equation to hold true is if the function  is a constant. Further, by the same equation this constant is unity. Thus,

for all systems . Since this holds for all infinitesimal intervals, it holds for all intervals.

Most, if not all, derivations of the Lorentz transformations take this  for granted. In those derivations, they use the constancy of the speed of light (invariance of light-like separated events) only. This result ensures that the Lorentz transformation is the correct transformation.

Rigorous Statement and Proof of Proportionality of ds2 and ds′2

Theorem:
Then, there exists a constant  such that . Furthermore, if we assume  and that  also has signature type , then we have .

Remarks.

This is a non-obvious mathematical fact which needs to be justified; fortunately the proof is relatively simple and it amounts to basic algebraic observations and manipulations.
 If we consider the special case where  then we're dealing with the situation of Lorentzian signature in 4-dimensions, which is what relativity is based on (or one could adopt the opposite convention with an overall minus sign; but this clearly doesn't affect the truth of the theorem). Also, in this case, if we assume  and  both have quadratics forms with the same null-set (in physics terminology, we say that  and  give rise to the same light cone) then the theorem tells us that there is a constant  such that . Modulo some differences in notation, this is precisely what was used in the section above.

Proof of Theorem.

Fix a basis  of  relative to which  has the matrix representation . The point is that the vector space  can be decomposed
So (by bilinearity)

Since the first summand on the right in non-positive and the second in non-negative, for any

From now on, always consider 
By bilinearity

In that case, subtracting the two expression above (and dividing by 4) yields

As above, for each 

Now consider nonzero  such that . We can find  such that . By the expressions above,

.

So .

Finally, if we assume that  both have signature types  and  then  (we can't have  because that would mean , which is impossible since having signature type  means it is a non-zero bilinear form. Also, if , then it means  has  positive diagonal entries and  negative diagonal entries; i.e it is of signature , since we assumed , so this is also not possible. This completes the proof of the theorem.

Standard configuration 

The invariant interval can be seen as a non-positive definite distance function on spacetime. The set of transformations sought must leave this distance invariant. Due to the reference frame's coordinate system's cartesian nature, one concludes that, as in the Euclidean case, the possible transformations are made up of translations and rotations, where a slightly broader meaning should be allowed for the term rotation.

The interval is quite trivially invariant under translation. For rotations, there are four coordinates. Hence there are six planes of rotation. Three of those are rotations in spatial planes. The interval is invariant under ordinary rotations too.

It remains to find a "rotation" in the three remaining coordinate planes that leaves the interval invariant. Equivalently, to find a way to assign coordinates so that they coincide with the coordinates corresponding to a moving frame.

The general problem is to find a transformation such that

Call this the standard configuration. It reduces the general problem to finding a transformation such that

The standard configuration is used in most examples below. A linear solution of the simpler problem

solves the more general problem since coordinate differences then transform the same way. Linearity is often assumed or argued somehow in the literature when this simpler problem is considered. If the solution to the simpler problem is not linear, then it doesn't solve the original problem because of the cross terms appearing when expanding the squares.

The solutions 
As mentioned, the general problem is solved by translations in spacetime. These do not appear as a solution to the simpler problem posed, while the boosts do (and sometimes rotations depending on angle of attack). Even more solutions exist if one only insist on invariance of the interval for lightlike separated events. These are nonlinear conformal ("angle preserving") transformations. One has

Some equations of physics are conformal invariant, e.g. the Maxwell's equations in source-free space, but not all. The relevance of the conformal transformations in spacetime is not known at present, but the conformal group in two dimensions is highly relevant in conformal field theory and statistical mechanics. It is thus the Poincaré group that is singled out by the postulates of special relativity. It is the presence of Lorentz boosts (for which velocity addition is different from mere vector addition that would allow for speeds greater than the speed of light) as opposed to ordinary boosts that separates it from the Galilean group of Galilean relativity. Spatial rotations, spatial and temporal inversions and translations are present in both groups and have the same consequences in both theories (conservation laws of momentum, energy, and angular momentum). Not all accepted theories respect symmetry under the inversions.

Using the geometry of spacetime

Landau & Lifshitz solution 
These three hyperbolic function formulae (H1–H3) are referenced below:

The most general solution is, as can be verified by direct substitution using (H1),

The equations become (using first ),

Now divide:

or, with the usual abbreviations,

This calculation is repeated with more detail in section hyperbolic rotation.

Hyperbolic rotation

The Lorentz transformations can also be derived by simple application of the special relativity postulates and using hyperbolic identities.

Relativity postulates

Start from the equations of the spherical wave front of a light pulse, centred at the origin:

which take the same form in both frames because of the special relativity postulates. Next, consider relative motion along the x-axes of each frame, in standard configuration above, so that y = y′, z = z′, which simplifies to

Linearity

Now assume that the transformations take the linear form:

where A, B, C, D are to be found. If they were non-linear, they would not take the same form for all observers, since fictitious forces (hence accelerations) would occur in one frame even if the velocity was constant in another, which is inconsistent with inertial frame transformations.

Substituting into the previous result:

Hyperbolic rotation

The equations suggest the hyperbolic identity 

Introducing the rapidity parameter  as a hyperbolic angle allows the consistent identifications

where the signs after the square roots are chosen so that  and  increase. The hyperbolic transformations have been solved for:

From physical principles

The problem is usually restricted to two dimensions by using a velocity along the x axis such that the y and z coordinates do not intervene, as described in standard configuration above.

Time dilation and length contraction
The transformation equations can be derived from time dilation and length contraction, which in turn can be derived from first principles.

By rearranging the first equation, we get

which is the space part of the Lorentz transformation. The second relation gives

which is the inverse of the space part.  Eliminating  between the two space part equations gives

that, if , simplifies to: 

which is the time part of the transformation, the inverse of which is found by a similar elimination of :

Spherical wavefronts of light

The following is similar to that of Einstein.
As in the Galilean transformation, the Lorentz transformation is linear since the relative velocity of the reference frames is constant as a vector; otherwise, inertial forces would appear. They are called inertial or Galilean reference frames. According to relativity no Galilean reference frame is privileged. Another condition is that the speed of light must be independent of the reference frame, in practice of the velocity of the light source.

Consider two inertial frames of reference O and O′, assuming O to be at rest while O′ is moving with a velocity v with respect to O in the positive x-direction. The origins of O and O′ initially coincide with each other. A light signal is emitted from the common origin and travels as a spherical wave front. Consider a point P on a spherical wavefront at a distance r and r′ from the origins of O and O′ respectively. According to the second postulate of the special theory of relativity the speed of light is the same in both frames, so for the point P:

The equation of a sphere in frame O is given by

For the spherical wavefront that becomes

Similarly, the equation of a sphere in frame O′ is given by

so the spherical wavefront satisfies

The origin O′ is moving along x-axis. Therefore,

Therefore, the transformation has the form

so, for all ,

and thus

This simplifies the transformation to

where  is to be determined.

or

with their expressions in terms of x, y, z and t produces:

and therefore,

which implies,

or

Equivalent expressions for γ can be obtained by matching the x2 coefficients or setting the  coefficient to zero.  Rearranging:

or, choosing the positive root to ensure that the x and x' axes and the time axes point in the same direction,

which is called the Lorentz factor. This produces the Lorentz transformation from the above expression. It is given by

The Lorentz transformation is not the only transformation leaving invariant the shape of spherical waves, as there is a wider set of spherical wave transformations in the context of conformal geometry, leaving invariant the expression .

Galilean and Einstein's relativity

Galilean reference frames
In classical kinematics, the total displacement x in the R frame is the sum of the relative displacement x′ in frame R′ and of the distance between the two origins x − x′. This relationship is linear for a constant , that is when R and R′ are Galilean frames of reference.

In Einstein's relativity, the main difference from Galilean relativity is that space and time coordinates are intertwined, and in different inertial frames t ≠ t′.

Since space is assumed to be homogeneous, the transformation must be linear.  The most general linear relationship is obtained with four constant coefficients, A, B, γ, and b:

The linear transformation becomes the Galilean transformation when γ = B = 1, b = −v and A = 0.

An object at rest in the R′ frame at position x′ = 0 moves with constant velocity v in the R frame. Hence the transformation must yield x′ = 0 if x = vt. Therefore, b = −γv and the first equation is written as

Using the principle of relativity

According to the principle of relativity, there is no privileged Galilean frame of reference: therefore the inverse transformation for the position from frame R′ to frame R should have the same form as the original but with the velocity in the opposite direction, i.o.w. replacing v with -v:

and thus

Determining the constants of the first equation
Since the speed of light is the same in all frames of reference, for the case of a light signal, the transformation must guarantee that t = x/c when t′ = x′/c.

Substituting for t and t′ in the preceding equations gives:

Multiplying these two equations together gives,

At any time after t = t′ = 0, xx′ is not zero, so dividing both sides of the equation by xx′ results in

which is called the "Lorentz factor".

When the transformation equations are required to satisfy the light signal equations in the form  and x′ = ct′, by substituting the x and x'-values, the same technique produces the same expression for the Lorentz factor.

Determining the constants of the second equation

giving

so that

which, when identified with

determines the transformation coefficients A and B as

So A and B are the unique constant coefficients necessary to preserve the constancy of the speed of light in the primed system of coordinates.

Einstein's popular derivation

In his popular book Einstein derived the Lorentz transformation by arguing that there must be two non-zero coupling constants  and  such that

that correspond to light traveling along the positive and negative x-axis, respectively.
For light  if and only if . Adding and subtracting the two equations and defining

gives

The constant  can be evaluated by demanding  as per standard configuration.

Using group theory

From group postulates

Following is a classical derivation (see, e.g.,  and references therein) based on group postulates and isotropy of the space.

Coordinate transformations as a group
The coordinate transformations between inertial frames form a group (called the proper Lorentz group) with the group operation being the composition of transformations (performing one transformation after another). Indeed, the four group axioms are satisfied:
 Closure: the composition of two transformations is a transformation: consider a composition of transformations from the inertial frame K to inertial frame K′, (denoted as K → K′), and then from K′ to inertial frame K′′, [K′ → K′′], there exists a transformation, [K → K′] [K′ → K′′], directly from an inertial frame K to inertial frame K′′.
 Associativity: the transformations ( [K → K′] [K′ → K′′] ) [K′′ → K′′′] and [K → K′] ( [K′ → K′′] [K′′ → K′′′] ) are identical.
 Identity element: there is an identity element, a transformation K → K.
 Inverse element: for any transformation K → K′ there exists an inverse transformation K′ → K.

Transformation matrices consistent with group axioms
Consider two inertial frames, K and K′, the latter moving with velocity  with respect to the former. By rotations and shifts we can choose the x and x′ axes along the relative velocity vector and also that the events  and  coincide. Now since the transformation we are looking after connects two inertial frames, it has to transform a linear motion in (t, x) into a linear motion in  coordinates. Therefore, it must be a linear transformation. The general form of a linear transformation is

Let us now consider the motion of the origin of the frame K′. In the K′ frame it has coordinates , while in the K frame it has coordinates . These two points are connected by the transformation

from which we get

Analogously, considering the motion of the origin of the frame K, we get

from which we get

Combining these two gives  and the transformation matrix has simplified,

Now consider the group postulate inverse element. There are two ways we can go from the K′ coordinate system to the K coordinate system. The first is to apply the inverse of the transform matrix to the K′ coordinates:

The second is, considering that the K′ coordinate system is moving at a velocity v relative to the K coordinate system, the K coordinate system must be moving at a velocity −v relative to the K′ coordinate system. Replacing v with −v in the transformation matrix gives:

Now the function  can not depend upon the direction of  because it is apparently the factor which defines the relativistic contraction and time dilation. Thus,  and comparing the two matrices, we get

According to the closure group postulate a composition of two coordinate transformations is also a coordinate transformation, thus the product of two of our matrices should also be a matrix of the same form. Transforming K to K′ and from K′ to K′′ gives the following transformation matrix to go from K to K′′:

Equating these elements and rearranging gives:

The denominator will be nonzero for nonzero , because  is always nonzero;

For the nonzero , this combination of function must be a universal constant, one and the same for all inertial frames. Solving

we finally get 

and thus the transformation matrix, consistent with the group axioms, is given by

If , then there would be transformations (with ) which transform time into a spatial coordinate and vice versa. We exclude this on physical grounds, because time can only run in the positive direction. Thus two types of transformation matrices are consistent with group postulates: 

Galilean transformations
If  then we get the Galilean-Newtonian kinematics with the Galilean transformation,

where time is absolute, and the relative velocity  of two inertial frames is not limited.

Lorentz transformations
If , then we set  which becomes the invariant speed, the speed of light in vacuum. This yields  and thus we get special relativity with Lorentz transformation

where the speed of light is a finite universal constant determining the highest possible relative velocity between inertial frames.

If  the Galilean transformation is a good approximation to the Lorentz transformation.

The experiments measuring the speed of light, first performed by a Danish physicist Ole Rømer, show that it is finite, and the Michelson–Morley experiment showed that it is an absolute speed, and thus that .

Boost from generators

Using rapidity  to parametrize the Lorentz transformation, the boost in the  direction is

likewise for a boost in the -direction

and the -direction

where  are the Cartesian basis vectors, a set of mutually perpendicular unit vectors along their indicated directions. If one frame is boosted with velocity  relative to another, it is convenient to introduce a unit vector  in the direction of relative motion. The general boost is

Notice the matrix depends on the direction of the relative motion as well as the rapidity, in all three numbers (two for direction, one for rapidity).

We can cast each of the boost matrices in another form as follows. First consider the boost in the  direction.

Expanding to first order gives the infinitesimal transformation

which is valid if  is small (hence  and higher powers are negligible), and can be interpreted as no boost (the first term  is the 4×4 identity matrix), followed by a small boost. The matrix

is the generator of the boost in the  direction, so the infinitesimal boost is

In the limit of an infinite number of infinitely small steps, we obtain the finite boost transformation

which is the limit definition of the exponential due to Leonhard Euler, and is now true for any .

and the boosts are

For any direction, the infinitesimal transformation is (small  and expansion to first order)

where

is the generator of the boost in direction . It is the full boost generator, a vector of matrices , projected into the direction of the boost . The infinitesimal boost is

Then in the limit of an infinite number of infinitely small steps, we obtain the finite boost transformation

which is now true for any .

we now need the powers of the generator. The square is

In general the odd powers  are

while the even powers  are

therefore the explicit form of the boost matrix depends only the generator and its square.

The boost is similar to Rodrigues' rotation formula,

Negating the rapidity in the exponential gives the inverse transformation matrix,

In quantum mechanics, relativistic quantum mechanics, and quantum field theory, a different convention is used for the boost generators; all of the boost generators are multiplied by a factor of the imaginary unit .

From experiments 

Howard Percy Robertson and others showed that the Lorentz transformation can also be derived empirically. In order to achieve this, it's necessary to write down coordinate transformations that include experimentally testable parameters. For instance, let there be given a single "preferred" inertial frame  in which the speed of light is constant, isotropic, and independent of the velocity of the source. It is also assumed that Einstein synchronization and synchronization by slow clock transport are equivalent in this frame. Then assume another frame  in relative motion, in which clocks and rods have the same internal constitution as in the preferred frame. The following relations, however, are left undefined:

  differences in time measurements,
  differences in measured longitudinal lengths,
  differences in measured transverse lengths,
  depends on the clock synchronization procedure in the moving frame,

then the transformation formulas (assumed to be linear) between those frames are given by:

 depends on the synchronization convention and is not determined experimentally, it obtains the value  by using Einstein synchronization in both frames.

See also

Lorentz group
Noether's theorem
Poincaré group
Proper time
Relativistic metric
Spinor

Notes

References

General relativity
Special relativity
Quantum mechanics